Estoloides grossepunctata is a species of beetle in the family Cerambycidae. It was described by Stephan von Breuning in 1940. It is known from Colombia.

References

Estoloides
Beetles described in 1940